Out the Gate is a 2011 Jamaican action film that follows Everton Dennis, played by Everton Dennis as he leave his home in Jamaica to make it big in the United States in music. It stars Paul Campbell, Oliver Samuels,  Shelli Boone,  and  Everton Dennis, was written by Qmillion and Everton Dennis and directed by R. Steven Johnson and Qmillion . The picture had its official limited release in the United States and Jamaica Distributed by Far I Films in 2011 followed by the DVD in 2012. The film was released to theaters in Los Angeles, New York, Atlanta, Toronto, as well as Jamaica. Newspaper Atlanta Daily World wrote the movie "appears to be on its way to becoming a classic.

Plot
The film tells the story of a dreamer, Everton (Everton Dennis) who after things go wrong in his home town of (Toll Gate)Clarendon, leaves for the United States to make it big in music, where the Don of LA (Paul Campbell) demands more than he can deliver.

Cast
 Paul Campbell as "Badz"
 Oliver Samuels as "Uncle Willie"
 Shelli Boone as "Tamika"
 Everton Dennis as "E-Dee"

Soundtrack 
"Ghetto Yutes Rise" feat. I-Octane by E-Dee
"Bruk Whyne" by E-Dee
"Hot Like Fiyah" by Junior P.
"Everyday" by Mr. Lexx
"Bongce Along" feat E-Dee by Ms. Triniti
"Wi Party" feat Akapello by E-Dee
"Bottle Service" feat. Jadakiss by Duane Darock
"Time Fi Move Up" feat. Vannichi and E-Dee by Qmillion
"Cant Stop Wi" feat Busy Signal by Karl Morrison
"No Other Girl" by E-Dee

Release dates
US Theatrical Release (Limited) May 13, 2011]]
US Soundtrack Release - June 5, 2012
US Video/DVD Release - Dec 11, 2012

References

External links 
 
 
 
 

2011 crime films
2011 films
Films about music and musicians
Films set in Jamaica
Jamaican drama films
Gangster films
Films set in Los Angeles
Jamaican films about cannabis
2010s buddy films